The 1980–81 season was Aston Villa's 81st in the Football League and their sixth consecutive season in the top division. They finished as league champions for the seventh time in their history, using just 14 players over the course of the campaign, of whom no fewer than seven were ever-present (Jimmy Rimmer, Kenny Swain, Ken McNaught, Dennis Mortimer, Des Bremner, Gordon Cowans and Tony Morley). Gary Shaw made 40 starts, Allan Evans 39 and Peter Withe 36, with Gary Williams (21 starts) and Colin Gibson (19) contesting the remaining spot in the starting XI. David Geddis and Eamonn Deacy made eight and five starts respectively.

Season summary
Villa began the season with three wins and a draw from their opening four league matches. They also beat Leeds United in both legs of the League Cup second round before their unbeaten start ended at Ipswich Town, who would prove to be Villa's main challengers for the title as the season progressed.

Defeat at home to Everton was followed by a 12 match unbeaten run, and although Villa lost three of the next five, a further unbeaten run of 10 matches ensued, including seven straight wins. A key performance during this latter period was a second v first clash at home to Liverpool, who at the time headed the table on goal difference. Goals from Withe and Mortimer confirmed Villa as genuine contenders as they beat the reigning champions 2–0.

Ron Saunders' team were neck-and-neck with Ipswich when the two clashed at Villa Park in mid-April, and a 2–1 victory for the visitors appeared to swing the destiny of the championship in their favour. However, Ipswich lost their next two matches while Villa beat Nottingham Forest and drew with Stoke City to reclaim the initiative. Victory over Middlesbrough in their final home match left Villa four points ahead with one to play, although Ipswich had a game in hand and a superior goal difference.

At half-time on the final Saturday of the league season, Villa trailed 2–0 at Arsenal, and with Ipswich 1–0 ahead at Middlesbrough, the title was still hanging in the balance. No further goals were added in the second half at Highbury, but the home side scored twice without reply at Ayresome Park, confirming Villa as champions for the first time since 1910.

Peter Withe ended the season as the First Division's joint leading scorer with 20 goals. Withe had previously won championship honours with Forest in 1978 and also played for Southport, Barrow, Wolverhampton Wanderers, Birmingham City and Newcastle United before joining Villa in the summer of 1980. During a five-year spell at Villa Park, he scored 74 goals in 182 League games and won 11 caps for England, scoring one goal. He later played for Sheffield United and Huddersfield Town.

Squad
Substitute appearances indicated in brackets

Results

First Division

League standings

League Cup

FA Cup

1980-81
Aston Villa
1981